Fangyuan Township is a rural township in Changhua County, Taiwan.

History
People have been immigrated from Fujian to the area since around 1640 CE, where they practiced fishing and traded with people in Fujian. The area was then known as Fanzaiwa. The place was then renamed Sunayama Village during the Japanese rule of Taiwan because of the sand dunes of the area. After the handover of Taiwan from Japan to the Republic of China in 1945, it became part of Taichung County. It was later renamed as Fangyuan Township and became part of Changhua County.

Geography
Fangyuan has been assigned the postal code 528. As of January 2023, there were 31,572 people in 10,129 households.

Administrative divisions
The township comprises 26 villages: Boai, Caohu, Dingbu, Fangyuan, Fangzhong, Furong, Hanbao, Heping, Houliao, Jianping, Lunjiao, Luping, Lushang, Minsheng, Renai, Sancheng, Sange, Wanggong, Wenjin, Wujun, Xinbao, Xingren, Xinjie, Xinsheng, Xinyi and Yongxing.

Tourist attractions
 Fangyuan Lighthouse
 Fuhai Temple
 Wanggong Fishing Port

References

Townships in Changhua County